is a Japanese manga series written and illustrated by Yūgo Ishikawa. It was serialized in Shogakukan's seinen manga magazine Big Comic Superior from April 2009 to April 2015, with its chapters collected in fifteen tankōbon volumes.

Plot
Yoshiko and her friends are visiting her shut-in uncle when a strong earthquake suddenly erupts. As the tremors subside, however, they come to realize that the world has mysteriously changed. As they wait for rescue, horrifying apparitions begin to haunt them and test their sanity.

Publication
Written and illustrated by Yūgo Ishikawa, Sprite was serialized in Shogakukan's seinen manga magazine Big Comic Superior from April 24, 2009, to April 10, 2015. Shogakukan collected its chapters in fifteen tankōbon volumes, released from February 27, 2010, to May 29, 2015.

It was published in France by Kazé and in Italy by GP Manga.

Volume list

References

External links
 

2009 manga
Action anime and manga
Science fiction anime and manga
Seinen manga
Shogakukan manga